Palazzo Chigi is a palace which is the seat of the Italian Government.

Palazzo Chigi may also refer to:
Palazzo Chigi-Odescalchi, in Rome
Palazzo Chigi, Ariccia
Palazzo Chigi, Formello

See also
Chigi family